Magang may refer to:

Masteel Group (马钢集团), also known as Magang (Group) Holding, a state-owned Chinese steel-making enterprise
Maanshan Iron and Steel (马鞍山钢铁股份有限公司), the subsidiary company of Magang (Group) Holding

Locations in China 
Magang, Dianbai County (麻岗镇), town in Guangdong
Magang, Kaiping (马冈镇), town in Guangdong
Magang, Hubei (马港镇), town in Tongcheng County
Magang (马岗村), Liuji, Dawu County, Xiaogan, Hubei